Leif Erikson Day is an annual observance that occurs on October 9. It honors Leif Erikson (Old Norse: Leifr Eiríksson, Swedish: Leif Eriksson), the Norse explorer who led the first Europeans thought to have set foot in continental North America (other than Greenland).

History
The 1874 book America Not Discovered by Columbus by Norwegian-American Rasmus B. Anderson helped popularize the idea that Vikings were the first Europeans in the New World, an idea that was verified in 1960. During his appearance at the Norse-American Centennial at the Minnesota State Fair in 1925, President Calvin Coolidge gave recognition to Leif Erikson as the discoverer of America due to research by Norwegian-American scholars such as Knut Gjerset and Ludvig Hektoen. In 1929, Wisconsin became the first U.S. state to officially adopt Leif Erikson Day as a state holiday, thanks in large part to efforts by Rasmus Anderson. In 1931, Minnesota did also. Thanks to the efforts of the Leif Erikson Memorial Association of Saskatchewan, the Legislative Assembly of Saskatchewan proclaimed—through an order-in-council in 1936—that Leif Ericsson Day would be observed on October 9. By 1956, Leif Erikson Day had been made an official observance in seven states (Wisconsin, Minnesota, South Dakota, Illinois, Colorado, Washington, and California) and one Canadian province (Saskatchewan).

In 1963, Senator Hubert Humphrey and Representative John Blatnik, both from Minnesota, introduced bills to observe Leif Erikson Day nationwide. On September 2, 1964, Congress unanimously authorized and requested the President to create the observance through an annual proclamation. Lyndon B. Johnson did so that year, as has each president in the years since, often using the proclamation to praise the contributions of Americans of Nordic descent generally and the spirit of discovery.

Bills have been introduced in the Parliament of Canada to observe Leif Erikson Day.

Date
October 9 is not associated with any particular event in Leif Erikson's life. The exact date of Leif's discovery of the Americas is unknown, but the Sagas state that it was in autumn. At the suggestion of Christian A. Hoen, 9 October was settled upon, as it took place in fall, and was already a historic date for Scandinavians in America. The date was chosen because the ship Restauration coming from Stavanger, Norway, arrived in New York Harbor on October 9, 1825, beginning a wave of immigration from Norway to America.

Observance
The federal government of the United States observes the holiday and some U.S. states officially commemorate Leif Erikson Day. It is celebrated in many communities, particularly in the Upper Midwest and other places where large numbers of people from the Nordic countries settled. It has long been observed in Seattle, Washington. In 2012, the day was made official in Las Vegas, Nevada. Westby, Wisconsin, and Norway, Michigan, have held festivals near the day. There have been Canadian commemorations, including in Edmonton, Alberta, and Charlottetown, Prince Edward Island. The day is also celebrated in Iceland.

In popular culture
The holiday was referenced in the episode "Bubble Buddy" of the Nickelodeon animated series SpongeBob SquarePants. On multiple occasions throughout the episode, characters shout "Happy Leif Erikson Day!", followed by some vaguely Norse-sounding gibberish. Forbes states that the holiday is often mainly associated online with its appearance in SpongeBob SquarePants, and poses that "[p]erhaps this is the best way to remember the day". The episode is arguably responsible for popularizing the holiday outside of the Norwegian-American community.

References

Further reading

Leif Erikson
Public holidays in the United States
October observances
Norwegian-American culture
Norwegian migration to North America
1964 establishments in the United States
Recurring events established in 1964